Antônio Lopes dos Santos, usually known as Antônio Lopes (born June 12, 1941) is a Brazilian football head coach and former footballer.

Before being a football head coach, he worked as a chief police officer in Rio de Janeiro city.

Antônio Lopes was the assistant manager of the Brazil national football team, managed by Émerson Leão, in 2000. He was also the assistant manager of the Brazil national team, managed by Luiz Felipe Scolari, during the successful 2002 FIFA World Cup campaign.

In 2005, he was the manager of Corinthians, replacing Márcio Bittencourt, during most of the Campeonato Brasileiro Série A season. The club, with Antônio Lopes as its head coach, won the competition.

Playing career
He played for Olaria from 1958 to 1961, and played for Bonsucesso in 1962.

Coaching career
During his career, he managed several clubs, including foreign clubs like Al Wasl of the United Arab Emirates,  Belenenses of Portugal, Cerro Porteño of Paraguay, and Brazilian clubs like Fluminense, Flamengo, Sport Recife, Portuguesa, Internacional, Santos, Atlético Paranaense, Grêmio, Vasco da Gama, Coritiba, Paraná, Corinthians and Goiás. On March 9, 2010, Atlético Paranaense executive board had decided to suddenly dismiss the coach for undisclosed reasons and despite the fact that the team's results were satisfactory, so far (six wins, four draws and only one loss). Leandro Niehues has been named interim coach until a full-time replacement is found. On July 12, 2011, Antônio Lopes was hired as América-MG's head coach.

Personal life
His son, Júnior Lopes, is also a football manager.

Honours
Club
 Copa Libertadores de América: 1998
 Campeonato Brasileiro Série A: 1997, 2005
 Campeonato Carioca: 1982, 1998, 2003
 Campeonato Paranaense: 1996, 2004
 Campeonato Pernambucano: 1988
 Campeonato Gaúcho: 1992, 1994
 Copa do Brasil: 1992
 Torneio Rio-São Paulo: 1999

Individual
Placar magazine's manager of year: 2005

References

External links
 

1941 births
Living people
Footballers from Rio de Janeiro (city)
Brazilian footballers
Association football forwards
Brazilian football managers
1984 AFC Asian Cup managers
Olaria Atlético Clube players
Bonsucesso Futebol Clube players
Olaria Atlético Clube managers
America Football Club (RJ) managers
CR Vasco da Gama managers
Kuwait national football team managers
Fluminense FC managers
CR Flamengo managers
Sport Club do Recife managers
Al-Wasl F.C. managers
Associação Portuguesa de Desportos managers
C.F. Os Belenenses managers
Sport Club Internacional managers
Santos FC managers
Al Hilal SFC managers
Cruzeiro Esporte Clube managers
Cerro Porteño managers
Paraná Clube managers
Grêmio Foot-Ball Porto Alegrense managers
Club Athletico Paranaense managers
Coritiba Foot Ball Club managers
Sport Club Corinthians Paulista managers
Goiás Esporte Clube managers
Avaí FC managers
Esporte Clube Vitória managers
América Futebol Clube (MG) managers
Expatriate football managers in Paraguay
Brazilian expatriates in Paraguay
Expatriate football managers in Kuwait
Brazilian expatriate sportspeople in Kuwait